Brand New Cherry Flavor is an American horror drama streaming television limited series created by Nick Antosca and Lenore Zion, based on the novel of the same name by Todd Grimson. The cast includes Rosa Salazar, Catherine Keener, Eric Lange, Manny Jacinto and Jeff Ward. The series premiered on Netflix on August 14, 2021.

Premise

Cast and characters

Main
 Rosa Salazar as Lisa Nova
 Catherine Keener as Boro/Jennifer Nathans
 Eric Lange as Lou Burke
 Jeff Ward as Roy Hardaway

Recurring
 Manny Jacinto as Chris/Code
 Hannah Levien as Christine
 Siena Werber as Mary Gray/Boro
 Daniel Doheny as Jonathan Burke
 Darcy Laurie as Ralph
 Sean Owen Roberts as James

Guest stars
 Leland Orser as Mike Nathans
 Patrick Fischler as Alvin Sender
 Gabriel LaBelle as Tim Nathans

Episodes

Production
On November 15, 2019, it was announced that Netflix had given the production a series order for an 8-episode series. The limited series was created, written and executive produced by Nick Antosca and Lenore Zion. Arkasha Stevenson directed the first episode. Production companies involved with the limited series consists of Eat the Cat and Universal Content Productions. Alongside the series order announcement, it was confirmed that Rosa Salazar, Catherine Keener, Eric Lange, Manny Jacinto, and Jeff Ward had joined the cast. On December 17, 2020, Hannah Levien, Leland Orser, and Patrick Fischler were announced as recurring cast members. Principal photography took place on location in Vancouver and Los Angeles from November 2019 to March 2020. The series was released on August 13, 2021.

Reception
Rotten Tomatoes collected 37 reviews and identified 78% of them as positive, with an average rating of 6.9/10. The critics consensus is: "Though definitely not for all tastes, Brand New Cherry Flavor is a delightfully deranged trip anchored by another incredible performance from Rosa Salazar." According to Metacritic, the series received "generally favorable reviews" based on a weighted average score of 62 out of 100 from 13 reviews.

References

External links
 
 

2020s American drama television miniseries
2020s American horror television series
2021 American television series debuts
2021 American television series endings
Dark fantasy television series
English-language Netflix original programming
Horror drama television series
Fiction about curses
Television series about filmmaking
Television series about revenge
Television series based on American novels
Television series set in the 1990s
Television shows filmed in Vancouver
Television shows set in Los Angeles
Witchcraft in television